Damjan Misa (born April 18, 2000) is a Macedonian professional basketball Point guard who plays for Crn Drim.

Professional career
On January 25, 2018, he had his debut for MZT Skopje in Macedonian League scoring 7 points and 4 assists in a home win against Shkupi. On August 20, 2018, he signed three-year deal with Kumanovo.

References

External links
 eurobasket.com
 realgm.com 
 bgbasket.com

2000 births
Living people
Macedonian men's basketball players
Sportspeople from Struga
Point guards
KK MZT Skopje players